The Sociedad Honoraria Hispánica (the national honor society for Spanish and Portuguese) is an academic honor society focused on Spanish language and Portuguese language excellence in secondary education and promotes a continuity of interest in Spanish and Portuguese studies. Its motto is "¡Todos a una!" ("All Together for One Goal"). The group, which was established in 1953 in the United States is sponsored by the American Association of Teachers of Spanish and Portuguese. Each chapter has its own unique name, which is associated with some aspect of the Spanish or Portuguese culture. Each society member must have completed at least three semesters of Spanish or Portuguese with an honor average as defined by the local chapter. He/she must be enrolled in Spanish at the time of induction and is required to maintain an "honor grade" or GPA, which correlates with the SHH's mission of high academic achievement.

Publications
Albricias is the quarterly publication of the Spanish Honor Society. Students may submit writings and artworks to the magazine. It also features reflective writings from the students who have won the college scholarships and/or travel awards.

Scholarships and awards
The Sociedad Honoraria Hispánica provides over $170,000 in awards to its chapters and members. The most prestigious awards are college scholarships to 60 high school seniors (Joseph Adams Senior Scholarship) and travel awards to 24 high school juniors from around the country (Bertie Green Travel Awards). The Bertie Green Travel Award destinations have included summer trips to Argentina, Peru, Mexico, and Spain. Each chapter can only nominate one student for each of those awards. There are also several awards for chapters and sponsors each year.

See also
German National Honor Society
National Honor Society
Société Honoraire de Français

References

External links
Sociedad Honoraria Hispánica
American Association of Teachers of Spanish and Portuguese
National Spanish Exam

High school honor societies
1953 establishments in the United States
Spanish as a second or foreign language